"Butterflies" is a popular song, written by Bob Merrill and recorded by Patti Page in 1953.

It was released by Mercury Records as catalog number 70183.

It entered on the Billboard chart on July 18, 1953 and lasted 10 weeks, peaking at number 10. On the Cash Box charts, it peaked at number 11.

References

Songs written by Bob Merrill
1953 songs
Patti Page songs